On 29 September 2017, aircraft attacked Armanaz and killed at least 35 people, including at least 3 children, according to 5 witnesses and photos and video footage analyzed by Human Rights Watch. The Syrian Observatory for Human Rights reported that the death toll included 8 children and 8 women.

Prelude
The Syrian and Russian air forces carried out several attacks which hit civilian targets in the days prior to this one, killing 18 people in Qalaat al-Madiq on September 20th and 19 people, including at least 2 children, in Jisr al-Shughur on September 25th.

The attack
At around 8:30 PM, an aircraft dropped several munitions on a residential neighborhood close to the Al-Zahra mosque in Armanaz. At 10 PM, an aircraft returned and bombed the same location again, which forced the rescuers to abandon the scene. 30 residential buildings were destroyed in total. Video published online allegedly showed rescuers pulling children's bodies from the rubble.

Reactions
Human Rights Watch called on belligerents in the Syrian conflict to refrain from using enhanced blast weapons like fuel-air explosives in populated areas.

See also
 List of massacres during the Syrian Civil War

References

 
 

Mass murder in 2017
Idlib Governorate in the Syrian civil war